(born February 7, 1970 in Nagano Prefecture) is a Japanese actor. He is an affiliate of Red Action Club and a former affiliate of Japan Action Enterprise. He is most known for his work in the Super Sentai series as a suit actor. He is the husband of fellow suit actress Naoko Kamio. He is current the action director of the Super Sentai series, having taken up the role starting with Tokumei Sentai Go-Busters.

Stunt/Suit Actor Roles

Super Sentai Series

 Choujuu Sentai Liveman (1988-1989) - Red Falcon, Jimmers
 Kousoku Sentai Turboranger (1989-1990) - Wular Soldiers
 Chikyu Sentai Fiveman (1990-1991) - Five Red, Batzler Soldiers
 Kyoryu Sentai Zyuranger (1992-1993) - Tyranno Ranger
 Gosei Sentai Dairanger (1993–1994) - Ryuuseioh
 Chōriki Sentai Ohranger (1995-1996) - Machine Beasts, Oh Red (sub)
 Gekisou Sentai Carranger (1996-1997) - Zelmoda, Red Racer (sub), Emperor Exhaus
 Seijuu Sentai Gingaman (1998-1999) - Budoh, Ginga Red (sub), Biznella
 Kyuukyuu Sentai GoGoFive (1999-2000) - Cobolda, Go Red (sub)
 Hyakujuu Sentai Gaoranger (2001-2002) -  Gao Red, Gao Muscle, Gao Hunter
 Ninpuu Sentai Hurricaneger (2002-2003) - Hurricane Red, [[Ninpuu Sentai Hurricaneger#Shinobi Machines|Gouraijin]] 
 Bakuryuu Sentai Abaranger (2003-2004) - Aba Red, Killer-Oh
 Tokusou Sentai Dekaranger (2004-2005) - Deka Red, Deka Base Robo, Gyoku Rou 
 Mahou Sentai Magiranger (2005-2006) Magi Green, Magi Taurus, Lunagel, Magi King, Magi Legend, Titan (main)
 GoGo Sentai Boukenger (2006-2007) - Bouken Red, Daitanken 
 Juken Sentai Gekiranger (2007-2008) - Geki Red, Geki Tohja, Geki Fire
 Engine Sentai Go-onger (2008-2009) - Go-on Red, Engine-Oh
 Samurai Sentai Shinkenger (2009-2010) - Shinken Red, Shinkenoh
 Tensou Sentai Goseiger (2010-2011) - Gosei Blue, Gosei Ultimate
 Kaizoku Sentai Gokaiger (2011-2012) - Gokai Red

Kamen Rider Series
 Kamen Rider Kuuga (2000-2001) - Gurongi
 Kamen Rider 555 (2003–2004) - Kamen Rider Faiz (sub)
 Kamen Rider Kabuto (2006–2007) - ZECTroopers
 Kamen Rider Kiva (2008–2009) - Fangire
 Kamen Rider Decade (2009) - Shinken Red, Kamen Rider Faiz, Kamen Rider Kabuto, Taurus Ballista
 Kamen Rider × Kamen Rider × Kamen Rider The Movie: Cho-Den-O Trilogy: Episode Yellow: Treasure de End Pirates (2010) - Kamen Rider Kabuki
 Kamen Rider W Returns: Kamen Rider Accel (2011) - Kamen Rider Accel

Metal Hero Series
 B-Robo Kabutack (1997-1998) - Spidon (Super Mode)

Ultra SeriesUltraman Gaia (1998-1999) - Ultraman Gaia (sub)Ultraman Max (2005-2006) - Ultraman Max (sub)Superior Ultraman 8 Brothers (2008) - Ultraman Gaia

Other RolesGamera 3: Revenge of Iris'' (1999) - Gamera

External links
 Official Profile at Red Action Club

1970 births
Japanese male film actors
Living people
People from Nagano Prefecture